John Elizabeth Stintzi is a Canadian-born writer, most noted for winning the RBC Bronwen Wallace Award for Emerging Writers in 2019. They are a dual citizen of both the United States and Canada.

Stintzi, who is non-binary and uses they/them pronouns, was raised in Bergland, Ontario, and educated at the University of Manitoba and Stony Brook University. While at Stony Brook, they wrote the novel Vanishing Monuments as their MFA thesis; after graduating, they moved to Jersey City, New Jersey, where they began writing the poetry collection Junebat.

Following their Bronwen Wallace award win, Stintzi secured publishers for both Junebat and Vanishing Monuments, which were both published in early 2020. Vanishing Monuments was shortlisted for the 2021 Amazon.ca First Novel Award.

Their third novel, My Volcano, was awarded the inaugural Sator New Works Award from Two Dollar Radio and was published in March 2022 by the press in the United States and Arsenal Pulp Press in Canada.

Stintzi currently teaches writing at the Kansas City Art Institute in Kansas City, Missouri.

References

External links

21st-century Canadian novelists
21st-century Canadian poets
Canadian expatriate writers in the United States
Canadian LGBT novelists
Canadian LGBT poets
Canadian non-binary writers
Writers from Jersey City, New Jersey
People from Rainy River District
University of Manitoba alumni
Stony Brook University alumni
Writers from Ontario
Living people
Year of birth missing (living people)
Non-binary novelists
21st-century Canadian LGBT people